Ace 2 may refer to:

 Angiotensin-converting enzyme 2 (ACE2)
 Samsung Galaxy Ace 2, a smartphone
 Ace 2 (video game), Air Combat Emulator II, a video game released in 1987

See also

 Ace (disambiguation)